2001–02 Belarusian Cup was the eleventh season of the Belarusian annual football cup competition. Contrary to the league season, it is conducted in a fall-spring rhythm. The first games were played on August 15, 2001. Winners of the Cup qualified for the UEFA Cup Qualifying round.

First round
The draw was conducted on 31 July 2001. Four First League clubs (Darida Minsk Raion, Zvezda-VA-BGU Minsk, Kommunalnik Slonim and Torpedo-Kadino Mogilev) were given a bye to the next round by a drawing of lots.
The games were played on 15 August 2001.

Round of 32
The draw was conducted on 16 August 2001. Five Premier League clubs (Dinamo Minsk, Neman-Belcard Grodno, Molodechno-2000, Gomel and Belshina Bobruisk) advanced to the next round by a drawing of lots.

Round of 16
The games were played on 14 October 2001.

Quarterfinals
The first legs were played on 25 April 2002. The second legs were played on 2 May 2002.

|}

First leg

Second leg

Semifinals
The first legs were played on 10 May 2002. The second legs were played on 18 May 2002.

|}

First leg

Second leg

Final

External links
RSSSF

Belarusian Cup seasons
Belarusian Cup
Cup
Cup